Coaches Stadium at Monier Field is a baseball venue in Charleston, Illinois, United States.  It is home to the Eastern Illinois Panthers baseball team of the NCAA Division I Ohio Valley Conference. It has a capacity of 500 spectators. Eastern Illinois' baseball program has used the field since its 1982 move to Division I. Originally known simply as Monier Field, the facility was renamed after 2002 renovations, which added chairback seating, a press box, a sprinkler system, brick dugouts, and concessions.  Fourteen red brick pillars, one for each of Eastern Illinois' 14 baseball coaches, surround the stadium.

See also 
 List of NCAA Division I baseball venues

References 

College baseball venues in the United States
Baseball venues in Illinois
Eastern Illinois Panthers baseball